Anthea Hucklesby FAcSS FRSA is Professor of Criminal Justice 
at the University of Birmingham where she holds a joint appointment in Birmingham Law School and the School of Social Policy. She was Head of the School of Social Policy at the University of Birmingham 2020-2022. She was a member of the Law School at the University of Leeds between 2003 and 2020 where she was latterly Pro-Dean for research and innovation in the Faculty of Social Sciences. She is a Fellow of the Academy of Social Sciences and the Royal Society for the encouragement of Arts, Manufactures and Commerce (RSA).

In 2016 she gave evidence before a House of Commons committee in connection with the Policing and Crime Bill 2015–16.

Selected publications
 Prisoner Resettlement: policy and practice (Willan, 2007), xiv, 306p
 Drug Interventions in Criminal Justice (Open University Press, 2010) (With E. Wincup)
 Bail Support Schemes for Adults, Researching Criminal Justice series (Policy Press, 2011)
 Criminal Justice, ed. by Hucklesby A and Wahidin A (Oxford University Press, 2013)
 Legitimacy and Compliance in Criminal Justice, ed. by Crawford A and Hucklesby A (Routledge, 2013)

References

Academics of the University of Leeds
Fellows of the Academy of Social Sciences
1966 births
Living people